Sturisoma is a genus of armored catfishes native to Central and South America.

Taxonomy
Sturisoma has been shown to be sister to Farlowella.

Species
There are currently 12 recognized species in this genus:
 Sturisoma barbatum (Kner, 1853)
 Sturisoma brevirostre (C. H. Eigenmann & R. S. Eigenmann, 1889)
 Sturisoma caquetae (Henry Weed Fowler, 1945)
 Sturisoma graffini Alejandro Londoño-Burbano, 2018
 Sturisoma guentheri (Regan, 1904)
 Sturisoma lyra (Regan, 1904)
 Sturisoma monopelte Fowler, 1914
 Sturisoma nigrirostrum Fowler, 1940
 Sturisoma reisi Londoño-Burbano & Britto, 2022
 Sturisoma robustum (Regan, 1904)
 Sturisoma rostratum (Spix & Agassiz, 1829)
 Sturisoma tenuirostre (Steindachner, 1910)

Distribution
The species of the genus Sturisoma are widely distributed on both slopes of the Andes, in Panama and Colombia, and in the Amazon, Orinoco, and Paraná River basins.

Description
Sexual dimorphism includes hypertrophied odontodes on the sides of the head of the male.

Ecology
Sturisoma inhabit gently to swiftly flowing white waters where submerged wood is abundant in the main flow of rivers. Sturisoma species are open brooders.

References

 
Fish of South America
Fish of the Amazon basin
Freshwater fish genera
Catfish genera
Taxa named by William John Swainson